The Atlanta Braves are a Major League Baseball (MLB) franchise based in Atlanta. They play in the National League East division. They were based in Milwaukee and Boston before moving to Atlanta for the 1966 season. The first game of the new baseball season for a team is played on Opening Day, and being named the Opening Day starter is an honor, which is often given to the player who is expected to lead the pitching staff that season, though there are various strategic reasons why a team's best pitcher might not start on Opening Day. The Atlanta Braves have used 22 different Opening Day starting pitchers in their 57 seasons in Atlanta. The 22 starters have a combined Opening Day record of 15 wins, 23 losses and 19 no decisions. No decisions are only awarded to the starting pitcher if the game is won or lost after the starting pitcher has left the game.

Hall of Famer Phil Niekro holds the Atlanta Braves' record for most Opening Day starts, with eight. Greg Maddux had seven for the team and Julio Teherán was featured six consecutive times from 2014 to 2019. Rick Mahler had five while Tom Glavine and John Smoltz have each made four Opening Day starts for the Braves.  Maddux has the record for most wins in Atlanta Braves Opening Day starts, with five.  Mahler has the highest winning percentage in Opening Day starts (1.000), with four wins and no losses with one no decision.  All of Mahler's four victories were shutouts, including three in consecutive years (1985 to 1987) by identical scores of 6–0.  Niekro has the record for most losses in Atlanta Braves Opening Day starts, with six.

From 1972 through 1980, the Braves lost nine consecutive Opening Day games. In those games, their starting pitchers had a record of no wins, six losses and three no decisions.  Niekro had five of the losses during this streak, and Carl Morton had the other.  Morton, Gary Gentry and Andy Messersmith had no decisions during the streak.  One of the most famous Opening Day games in baseball history occurred during this stretch. That was the game on April 4, 1974, against the Cincinnati Reds at Riverfront Stadium, when Hank Aaron hit his 714th career home run to tie Babe Ruth's all-time record.  Carl Morton was Atlanta's starting pitcher for that game, and received a no decision.

Overall, Atlanta Braves Opening Day starting pitchers have a record of 4–5 with four no decisions at Atlanta–Fulton County Stadium, their original home ball park in Atlanta. They have a 3–3 record with three no decisions at their second home park in Atlanta, Turner Field. At their current home park of Truist Park, originally named SunTrust Park, they have a 0–1 record with one no decision. This gives the Atlanta Braves' Opening Day starting pitchers a combined home record 7–9 with eight no decisions.  Their away record is 8–14 with eleven no decisions.  The Braves went on to play in the World Series in 1991, 1992, 1995, 1996, 1999 and 2021, winning the 1995 and 2021 iterations.  John Smoltz was the Opening Day starting pitcher in 1991, Tom Glavine in 1992 and 1999, Greg Maddux in 1995 and 1996, and Max Fried in 2021.  They have a combined Opening Day record of 3–2 in years that the Atlanta Braves played in the World Series.

Key

Pitchers

Footnotes
  Tony Cloninger had one Opening Day start for the Atlanta Braves in 1966.  He also had one Opening Day start for the Milwaukee Braves in 1965, giving him a total of two Opening Day starts for the Braves' franchise.

References
General

Specific

Opening day starters
Lists of Major League Baseball Opening Day starting pitchers